Brindley is a village in Cheshire, England.

Brindley may also refer to:

Places 
 Brindley Heath, Staffordshire, England
 Brindley Mountain, Alabama, US

People

Surname 
 Aud Brindley (1923–1957), American basketball player
 Bill Brindley (born 1982), American soccer player
 Bill Brindley (footballer) (1947–2007), English footballer
 Brian Brindley (1931–2001), Anglican priest
 Charles Brindley (born 1955), American artist
 Chris Brindley (born 1969), English footballer
 David Brindley (born 1953), Church of England priest
 Doug Brindley (born 1949), Canadian ice hockey player
 Gavin Brindley (born 2004), American ice hockey player
 Giles Brindley (born 1926), British physiologist and musicologist
 Harry Samuel Bickerton Brindley (1867–1920), British engineer
 Horace Brindley (1885–1971), English footballer 
 James Brindley (1716–1772), English engineer
 John Brindley (1850–1926), American jurist and legislator
 Lewis Brindley (born 1983), British YouTube gamer from The Yogscast
 Dame Lynne Brindley (born 1950), British librarian
 Madge Brindley (1901–1968), British film actress
 Maud Doria Brindley (1889–1941), English ornithologist and explorer
 Maud Mary Brindley (1866–1939), English artist and suffragette
 Neil Brindley (born 1967), Australian rules footballer
 Oscar Brindley (1885–1918), American aviator
 Paul Brindley (musician), bassist of The Sundays
 Paul Brindley (biologist) (born 1954), Australian parasitologist
 Richard Brindley (born 1993), English footballer
 Roy Brindley (born 1969), British professional poker player
 Thomas Brindley (1841–1911), English cricketer
 Tracey Brindley (born 1972), British runner
 William Brindley (1896–1958), English police officer and cricketer
 William Brindley of Farmer & Brindley, British architectural sculptors

Given name 
 Brindley Charles (born 1948), Dominican cricketer

Other uses 
The Brindley, a theatre in Runcorn, Cheshire, England
Brindley Water Mill, Leek, Staffordshire, England